The 2018–19 Middle Tennessee Blue Raiders men's basketball team represented Middle Tennessee State University during the 2018–19 NCAA Division I men's basketball season. The Blue Raiders, led by 1st-year head coach Nick McDevitt, played their home games at the Murphy Center in Murfreesboro, Tennessee as members of Conference USA.

Previous season 
The Blue Raiders finished the 2017–18 season 25–8 overall, 16–2 in C-USA play to win the regular season championship. In the C-USA tournament, they were defeated in the quarterfinals by Southern Miss in overtime. As a regular season conference champion who failed to win their conference tournament, the Blue Raiders received an automatic bid to the National Invitation Tournament, where they defeated Vermont in the first round before losing to Louisville in the second round.

The season marked the first time in the program's history that the Blue Raiders were ranked in the AP Top 25 during the season, coming in at No. 24 on the week of February 19.

Head coach Kermit Davis left the school on March 19, 2018 to accept the head coaching job at Ole Miss. He finished at Middle Tennessee with a 16-year record of 332–188. On March 24, the Blue Raiders named UNC Asheville head coach Nick McDevitt as the team's new head coach.

Offseason

Departures

Incoming transfers

2018 recruiting class

2019 recruiting class

Roster

Schedule and results

|-
!colspan=9 style=| Non-conference regular season

|-
!colspan=9 style=| Conference USA regular season

|-
!colspan=9 style=| Conference USA tournament

Source

References

Middle Tennessee Blue Raiders men's basketball seasons
Middle Tennessee
Middle Tennessee Blue Raiders
Middle Tennessee Blue Raiders